Kindzadza, real name Lev Greshilov (Russian: Лев Грешилов), is a dark psytrance music producer based in Moscow, Russia. His stage name is derived from the title of the popular Soviet movie Kin-dza-dza! He is currently booked with the Osom Music record label.
KinDzaDza was one of the first musicians to perform DarkPsy in Russia in the early 2000s, along with such performers as Psykovsky and Transdriver.

Biography
Leo was born in Moscow, got acquainted with computers and learned that with their help you can extract wonderful sounds. Then there was a trip to Goa, after which he began to write his music.

Discography
Kindzadza — Waves From Outer Space (Parvati Records) (2004)
Kindzadza And Friends — 13 Dimension Connection (Insomnia Records) (2005)
Kindzadza — Waves From Inner Space (Osom Music) (2007)
Kindzadza — Insoluble (2010)
Kindzadza - Nano Ninja (Osom Music) (2012)
Kindzadza - I`d like You to be a Mind Reader (Osom Music) (2016)
Kindzadza - Rugged Tales Part 1 (Osom Music) (2020)

External links

Kindzadza in Discogs.com
Osom Music official website
Kindzadza official Soundcloud page

Russian musicians
Psychedelic trance musicians
Living people
Year of birth missing (living people)